Štefan Malík (born 11 February 1966 in Šurany, Nitra Region) is a retired male race walker from Slovakia, who competed in two consecutive Summer Olympics for his native country.

Achievements

External links
 
 

1966 births
Living people
People from Šurany
Sportspeople from the Nitra Region
Slovak male racewalkers
Athletes (track and field) at the 1996 Summer Olympics
Athletes (track and field) at the 2000 Summer Olympics
Olympic athletes of Slovakia